The  is a museum in Haramachida, Machida City, Tokyo, Japan.

History
The museum opened in 1987.

Exhibitions
The museum exhibits 30,000 Japanese and Western paintings since 8th century until today. It has permanent and temporary exhibitions.

Transportation
The museum is accessible within walking distance east of Machida Station of East Japan Railway Company or Machida Station of Odakyu Electric Railway.

See also
 List of museums in Tokyo

References

External links

 

1987 establishments in Japan
Museums established in 1987
Art museums and galleries in Tokyo
Machida, Tokyo